Dequalinium is a quaternary ammonium cation and bolaamphiphile commonly available as the dichloride salt. It is useful as an antiseptic and disinfectant. The bromide, iodide, acetate, and undecenoate salts are known as well. Dequalinium chloride is the active ingredient of several medications. 

The dequalinium dication is symmetrical, containing two quaternary quinolinium units linked by an N-decylene chain.

Medical uses 
Dequalinium chloride 0.25 mg is available as an over-the-counter throat lozenge under brand names such as Dequadin and SP Troche. Mousewash and buccal sprays at 0.5 % concentration are also available. In this form is it used to treat minor infections of the mouth and throat. It can help with tonsillitis but is not effective in cases of streptococci infections.

The product is also available as a 10 mg prescription vaginal tablet for treating vaginal bacterial conditions (i.e. bacterial Vaginosis and aerobic vaginitis). Brand names include Fluomizin and Vablys.

In Austria, dequalinium chloride is combined with bacitracin and diphenylpyraline in Eucillin "B", an antibiotic cream. This cream is the first dequalinium-containing product to enter Austria in 1967.

Spectrum of activity 
Dequalinium salts have broad bactericidal and fungicidal activity. In OTC oral products containing a low concentration, the product is instead described as a bacteriostat.

Dequalinium salts may have antimalarial activities.

Adverse effects 
Dequalinium may cause skin necrosis "if administered on intertriginous skin areas under occlusive conditions".

History 
Dequalinium was first described by M Babbs and colleagues in 1956, as the first agent of the bisquaternary ammonium chemical class.

References

Further reading

External links 
 International Mark - Fluomizin(804560)
 Medinova Fluomizin
 Comparative Study of Efficacy of 10 mg Dequalinium Chloride (Fluomizin) in the Local Treatment of Bacterial Vaginosis

Quinolines
Quaternary ammonium compounds
Antiseptics